John W. Springer (July 16, 1859 – January 10, 1945) was an attorney and banker in Illinois, Texas, and Colorado. He was a clerk during the 50th United States Congress (1887–1889) and represented his district in the Illinois state legislature. He was active in business, politics, and society in Denver, Colorado. Springer had a 10,000 acre ranch and farm, which included the Highlands Ranch Mansion. The ranch became the suburb of Highlands Ranch, Colorado. His second wife, Isabel Patterson Springer, was the center of a scandal that resulted in the murder of two men at the Brown Palace Hotel.

Early life and education
John Wallace Springer, born in Jacksonville, Illinois on July 16, 1859, was the son of Sarah Henderson and John Thomas Springer, who was a banker and an attorney. A War Democrat, he was a member of the legislature and supported Abraham Lincoln. John's mother Sarah Henderson Springer was from one of the distinguished families of Kentucky. His uncle William McKendree Springer was an Illinois legislator and judge in Washington, D.C. on the United States court of appeals. He was raised in Jacksonville, Illinois.

He attended public schools and Whipple Academy. He attended Illinois College for one year before enrolling at Asbury College in Indiana (now DePauw University). He graduated in 1878 with a Bachelor of Arts degree. He was a member of Phi Kappa Psi. At Asbury, he was trained in public speaking and debate. He provided an address to his graduating class on statesmanship. He took a trip aboard following graduation. He then studied the law and was admitted to the bar in Illinois in 1880.

Career
He opened the law firm Springer & Dummer and practiced law in Jacksonville, Illinois for almost a decade. During the 50th United States Congress (1887–1889), he represented his district as a clerk of the committee on territories. In 1891, he represented his district in the Illinois House of Representatives. He practiced law and became involved in the banking industry in Dallas, Texas.

He moved to Denver in 1896. Due to the silver issue, Springer left the Democratic Party and was active there in William McKinley's presidential campaign, which involved travel throughout the state. He was involved in social, business, and political activities locally and across the state. He was an owner of Capital National Bank and in 1902 he was the company's president. He purchased the Continental building at Lawrence and 16th Street, and established the Continental Trust Company in 1902 with his father-in-law Colonel William E. Hughes. He then became the company's vice president. In 1909, the company was reorganized and he was president of Continental Trust Company. He was treasurer and secretary of the Continental Land and Title Company.

He ran for mayor of Denver against Robert W. Speer in 1904, but was defeated. It is claimed that there was fraud in the counting of the ballots and is considered one of the most corrupt elections in Denver's history. He was endorsed as a vice-presidential candidate at the state Republican Party convention in 1904. He was a candidate for the United States Senate in 1906.

He became involved with the Denver Chamber of Commerce, where he served as the vice-president and the director. He was the member of a number of civic, political, and professional organizations in Denver and was known for his skills as a public speaker.

Ranch

He purchased 10,000 acres overlooking Denver to create a farm and a ranch, including Highlands Ranch Mansion, called the Springer Cross Country Horse and Cattle Ranch in 1898. He became the area's largest land-owner. He bought the property through a series of purchases while he was married to his first wife, Eliza Hughes Springer. The ranch grew to 12,000 acres and Springer pursued his interest in show horses, raising rare German Oldenburg coach stallions. After his first wife Eliza had died and his second wife was involved in a scandal, he sold the ranch to Eliza's father, Colonel William E. Hughes in 1913. The ranch ultimately became the Denver suburb of Highlands Ranch, Colorado.

From 1898 to 1905, he was president of the National Livestock Association. He was president of the Colorado Cattle and Horse Growers Association beginning in 1907. He supported efforts for irrigation and the sugar beet industries. He lobbied for legislation of interest to the National Livestock Association in Washington, D.C.

Personal life

Eliza Clifton Hughes
On June 17, 1891, he married Eliza Clifton Hughes, whose father was Colonel William E. Hughes of Dallas, Texas. Springer handled business matters for his father-in-law's ranch and cattle business. Eliza and John had two daughters, Annie Clifton and Sarah Elizabeth, but Sarah died before her first birthday. Annie was born in Dallas on December 22, 1892. The Springers and Eliza's parents, Annie and Colonel William Hughes, moved to Denver in 1896. Eliza had tuberculosis and they moved to Colorado for her health, and Annie often lived with her grandparents. Springer bought a house at 1801 Williams Street, Denver in 1896. Eliza died on May 22, 1904. Annie lived most of the time with her grandparents, due to her father's "busy, on-the-go" lifestyle. She inherited her mother's fortune in 1907.

Isabel Patterson Folck
Springer met Isabel Patterson Folck in Denver when she was on a trip. During the summer of 1906, he had a relationship with the married woman, who was described as "a beautiful, audacious young woman who developed an addiction to nightlife, narcotics, and adventure." Isabel was twenty years Springer's junior. She returned to her home in St. Louis to obtain a divorce from a traveling salesman, John E. Folck. Springer and Isabel were married in St. Louis, Missouri in April 1907, three days after she received her divorce. After they were married and had a wedding luncheon, they boarded a train for Denver. They lived at Springer's house in Denver and at the ranch.

When Isabel missed the nightlife, Springer rented a suite at the Brown Palace Hotel so that she could stay there after evenings out with her friends. Having heard rumors about Isabel's promiscuity, Colonel Hughes was able to gain custody of his granddaughter Annie from Springer. Hughes had checked out her reputation. After he received guardianship, Annie and her grandparents moved to St. Louis. Hughes also sold off every investment that he had that was associated with Springer, which had a significant negative impact on Springer's wealth and future income.

Isabel traveled with Springer on business trips, but did not always come back with him. She sometimes visited friends in St. Louis. She had a relationship with Tony von Phul of St. Louis before her marriage that continued after her marriage. She wrote him intimate letters beginning in January 1911 and asked for him to visit her in Denver. Two months later, she became close with one of her husband's business partners, Harold Francis Henwood. They sometimes stayed by themselves at the family's ranch when Springer was out of town. On May 12, she asked for Henwood to retrieve letters that she had written to von Phul. Then on May 20, she wrote another letter to von Phul, who took a train to Denver on May 23. On that day, Henwood visited Isabel at the Springer's suite in the Brown Palace Hotel and she expressed her desire to end the relationship with von Phul, who threatened to share her letters with her husband if the affair was ended. On the night of May 24, Henwood shot and killed von Phul, and accidentally killed an innocent bystander, George Copeland, in the hotel's Marble Bar. The murders culminated in a very public trial.

Springer filed for divorce the day after the murders and was divorced on July 1, 1911 in Denver, Colorado. A condition of the divorce was that Isabel would forever leave Denver. She left on an eastbound train right after the completion of the murder trial. Isabel died in Chicago in a charity ward in 1917.

Janette Elizabeth Muir

On August 26, 1915, he married a 27 year old woman, Janette Elizabeth Orr Muir Lotave. He was a friend of her family. She was born in 1888 in Scotland and came to the United States in 1890 with her family. She married Carl Lotave, an artist, when she was 17 or 18 years of age and divorced him in 1909. She became a naturalized citizen a year after her marriage to Springer.

The Springers lived on Sloan Lake at 1655 Vrain Street and called the house Springer Lodge. In 1926, Janette bought a house at 2900 South University Boulevard called Wellshire Park Cottage for cost of the construction loan. Janette and John lived there in 1927 and until March 1928, when the house was foreclosed. They lived together at multiple residences over the course of their marriage, including a cottage at 888 York Street and in Littleton.

Death
He died in a hospital on January 10, 1945 and was buried at the Littleton Cemetery. His third wife, Janette, is buried next to him. She died October 3, 1957 in Littleton, Colorado.

Notes

References

External links
 

1859 births
1945 deaths
Politicians from Jacksonville, Illinois
Illinois lawyers
Members of the Illinois House of Representatives
Businesspeople from Denver
Politicians from Denver
Illinois College alumni
DePauw University alumni
Ranchers from Colorado
Businesspeople from Dallas